Bruce Bolden (born November 30, 1963) is an American former professional basketball player. He played 17 years in the National Basketball League (NBL) in Australia. He won an NBL championship with the South East Melbourne Magic in 1992, when he was named the NBL Grand Final Most Valuable Player (MVP). He led the league in rebounding in 1993, and he was also named the  NBL Best Sixth Man in 1999. His final season was played in the Australian Basketball Association with the Albury Wodonga Bandits in 2003–04. His No. 32 was the first jersey to ever be retired by the West Sydney Razorbacks.

After retiring as a player, Bolden started MyHoops, a basketball coaching service in Australia for young players from 7 to 18 years old.

Bruce often appears as a guest on the Aussie Hoopla podcast where he provides his thoughts on how players can make it to an elite level and his views on basketball in Australia.

Personal life
Bolden’s ex wife is Marie Yacoub. Their son, Jonah Bolden, played college basketball with the UCLA Bruins, played professionally in Serbia  and in Israel for Maccabi Tel Aviv. Jonah was drafted in the second round with the 36th pick in the 2017 NBA Draft by the Philadelphia 76ers. 
Their daughter, Cairo Bolden is a model in New York, USA.

References

External links
NBL stats at foxsportspulse.com

Living people
1963 births
African-American basketball players
American expatriate basketball people in Australia
American expatriate basketball people in Norway
Basketball players from Jackson, Mississippi
Basketball players with retired numbers
Boise State Broncos men's basketball players
Eastside Spectres players
Forwards (basketball)
South East Melbourne Magic players
Sydney Kings players
West Sydney Razorbacks players
American men's basketball players
21st-century African-American people
20th-century African-American sportspeople